The 1942–43 Washington Huskies men's basketball team represented the University of Washington for the  NCAA college basketball season. Led by 23rd-year head coach Hec Edmundson, the Huskies were members of the Pacific Coast Conference and played their home games on campus at the UW Pavilion in Seattle, Washington.

In the eight-team NCAA tournament, Washington played in the West Regional in Kansas City. They lost to Texas by four points, then fell to Oklahoma in the consolation game.

Postseason results

|-
!colspan=5 style=| Pacific Coast Conference Playoff Series

|-
!colspan=5 style=| NCAA Tournament

References

External links
Sports Reference – Washington Huskies: 1942–43 basketball season

Washington Huskies men's basketball seasons
Washington Huskies
Washington
Washington